The Graphidaceae are a family of lichens in the order Ostropales.

Distribution and ecology
The vast majority of Graphidaceae species are restricted to the tropics. Most Graphidaceae species are epiphytic (i.e. they grow only on plants).

Genera
A recent (2020) estimates places 31 genera and about 990 species in Graphidaceae. The following list indicates the genus name, the taxonomic authority, year of publication, and the number of species:
Acanthothecis  – 5 spp.
Acanthotrema  – 1 sp.
Aggregatorygma  – 1 sp.
Allographa  – 183 spp.
Amazonotrema  – 1 sp.
Ampliotrema  – 1 sp.
Anomalographis  – 2 spp.
Anomomorpha  – 8 spp.
Astrochapsa  – 29 spp.
Austrotrema  – 3 spp.
Borinquenotrema  – 1 sp.
Byssotrema  – 1 sp.
Carbacanthographis  – 22 spp.
Chapsa  – 51 spp.
Chroodiscus  – 17 spp.
Clandestinotrema  – 17 spp.
Compositrema  – 4 spp.
Corticorygma  – 1 sp.
Creographa  – 1 spp.
Cruentotrema  – 6 spp.
Crutarndina  – 1 sp.
Cryptoschizotrema  – 1 sp.
Cyclographina  – 8 spp.
Diaphorographis  – 2 spp.
Diorygma  – 74 spp.
Diploschistes  – 25 spp.
Dyplolabia  – 5 spp.
Enigmotrema  – 1 sp.
Fibrillithecis  – 15 spp.
Fissurina  – 117 spp.
Flegographa  – 1 sp.
Glyphis  – 7 spp.
Graphina  – 25 spp.
Graphis  – ca. 275 spp.
Gymnographopsis  – 1 sp.
Gyrotrema  – 6 spp.
Halegrapha  – 9 spp.
Heiomasia  – 3 spp.
Helminthocarponomyces  – 1 sp.
Hemithecium  – ca. 50 spp.
Jocatoa  – 1 sp.
Kalbographa  – 5 spp.
Leiorreuma  – 18 spp.
Leptotrema  – 14 spp.
Leucodecton  – 32 spp.
Malmographina  – 1 sp.
Mangoldia  – 2 spp.
Melanotopelia  – 4 spp.
Melanotrema  – 12 spp.
Myriochapsa  – 3 spp.
Myriotrema  – 76 spp.
Nadvornikia  – 5 spp.
Nitidochapsa  – 5 spp.
Ocellularia  – 343 spp.
Pallidogramme  – 13 spp.
Paratopeliopsis  – 1 sp.
Phaeographina  – 11 spp.
Phaeographis  – ca. 180 spp.
Phaeotrema  – 19 spp.
Platygramme  – 30 spp.
Platythecium  – 27 spp.
Pliariona  – 1 sp.
Polystroma  – 1 sp.
Pseudochapsa  – 18 spp.
Pseudoramonia  – 4 spp.
Pseudotopeliopsis  – 4 spp.
Pycnotrema  – 2 spp.
Redingeria  – 8 spp.
Redonographa  – 5 spp.
Reimnitzia  – 1 sp.
Rhabdodiscus  – 36 spp.
Sanguinotrema  – 1 sp.
Sarcographa  – 37 spp.
Sarcographina  – 6 spp.
Schistophoron  – 5 spp.
Schistostoma  – 1 sp.
Schizotrema  – 7 spp.
Stegobolus  – 16 spp.
Thalloloma  – 20 spp.
Thecaria  – 4 spp.
Thecographa  – 3 spp.
Thelotrema  – 165 spp.
Topeliopsis  – 20 spp.
Tremotylium  – 4 spp.
Wirthiotrema  – 5 spp.
Xalocoa  – 1 sp.

References

Lecanoromycetes families
Taxa described in 1763
Taxa named by Barthélemy Charles Joseph Dumortier
Lichen families